The Taitung Railway Art Village is an art center in Taitung City, Taitung County, Taiwan.

History
After the opening of South-link line, the volume of passengers and freight became too large for the old Taitung Station to handle. The line connecting to the old Taitung Station was then decommissioned in 2001. The new Taitung Station was then constructed and the old one was turned into an art center named Taitung Railway Art Village.

Architecture
The art center consists of art studio, classroom, performance stage and Hualien Railway Culture Museum which were converted from the warehouses of the old station. The old station hall was converted into the information center of the art center.

See also
 List of tourist attractions in Taiwan

References

Art centers in Taitung County
Defunct railway stations in Taiwan